Kenneth Walker (born 28 October 1970) is an English former cricketer. He played seven first-class matches for Cambridge University Cricket Club in 1999.

See also
 List of Cambridge University Cricket Club players

References

External links
 

1970 births
Living people
English cricketers
Cambridge University cricketers
People from Makhanda, Eastern Cape
Cricketers from the Eastern Cape